Glimcher Realty Trust was a real estate investment trust based in Columbus, Ohio that invested in shopping malls. In 2015, the company was acquired by Washington Prime Group.

Investments
As of December 31, 2013, the company owned interests in 28 shopping centers in 15 states in the United States containing 19.3 million square feet of gross leasable area.

Notable properties wholly owned by the company included the following:

History
The company was founded as The Glimcher Company by Herbert Glimcher in 1959, who started in the lumber business. Throughout much of its history, the company's largest tenant was Kmart.

In 1998, the company acquired 5 shopping malls for $375 million.

In 1999, the company received a $1 billion investment from Nomura Holdings to build 4 shopping centers.

On January 26, 1994, the company became a public company via an initial public offering.

In 2004, the company sold 25 properties for $103.1 million.

In 2007, the company sold University Mall in Tampa, Florida for $149 million.

In 2010, the company closed a $320 million joint venture with The Blackstone Group, which included the sale of a 60% interest in 2 malls.

In 2011, the company completed an asset swap with DDR Corp. in which the company sold Polaris Towne Center and purchased Town Center Plaza for $139 million.

In 2013, the company acquired University Park Village in Fort Worth, Texas for $105 million. The company also acquired Blackstone's 60% interest in WestShore Plaza.

In 2015, the company was acquired by Washington Prime Group for $4.3 billion in stock and cash. As part of the transaction, Jersey Gardens and University Park Village were sold to Simon Property Group for $1.09 billion.

References

1959 establishments in Ohio
2015 mergers and acquisitions
Defunct real estate companies of the United States
Real estate companies established in 1959
Washington Prime Group